Hits! the Videos is a DVD released by British synthpop duo Erasure as a companion to their greatest hits album Hits - the Very Best of Erasure.  The double-disc set was released by Mute Records in 2003 and contained all music video clips from the band from their inception in 1985 up to 2003.  Also included are several live and television performances, alternate videos and promotional documentaries and interviews with Vince Clarke and Andy Bell during the course of their career.

Track listing and production notes

Disc one
 "Who Needs Love Like That"Directed by: John Scarlett-DaviesProduction company: Aldabra
 "Heavenly Action"Directed by: John Scarlett-DaviesProduction company: Aldabra
 "Oh L'amour"Directed by: Peter Hamilton and Alistair Rae
 "Sometimes"Directed by: Gerard de ThameProduction company: Lee Lacy
 "It Doesn't Have To Be"Directed by: Gerard de ThameProduction company: HLA
 "Victim of Love"Directed by: Peter ScammellProduction company: State
 "The Circus"Directed by: Jerry ChaterProduction company: Media Lab
 "Ship of Fools"Directed by: Phillip VileProduction company: HLA
 "Chains of Love"Directed by: Peter ChristophersonProduction company: Aubrey Powell Productions
 "A Little Respect"Directed by: Peter ChristophersonProduction company: Aubrey Powell Productions
 "Stop!"Directed by: Peter ChristophersonProduction company: Aubrey Powell Productions
 "Drama!"Directed by: The GibletsProduction company: HLA
 "You Surround Me"Directed by: James le BonProduction company: Popata
 "Blue Savannah"Directed by: Kevin GodleyProduction company: Media Lab
 "Star"Directed by: John MayburyProduction company: Limelight
 "Chorus"Directed by: David MalletProduction company: Serpent Films
 "Love to Hate You"Directed by: David MalletProduction company: Serpent Films
 "Am I Right?"Directed by: Angela ConwayProduction company: State
 "Breath of Life"Directed by: Angela ConwayProduction company: State
 "Lay All Your Love on Me"Directed by: Jan KounenProduction company: HLA
 "S.O.S."Directed by: Jan KounenProduction company: HLA
 "Take a Chance on Me"Directed by: Philippe GautierProduction company: Oil Factory
 "Voulez-Vous"Directed by: Jan KounenProduction company: HLA
 "Always"Directed by: Jan KounenProduction company: HLA
 "Run to the Sun"Directed by: Nico BeyerProduction company: Propaganda
 "I Love Saturday"Directed by: Caz Gorham and Frances DickensonProduction company: The Christmas TV and Film Co.
 "Stay With Me"Directed by: Mario CavalliProduction company: Pizazz
 "Fingers & Thumbs (Cold Summer's Day)"Directed by: Max Abbiss-BiroProduction company: Sensons Films
 "Rock Me Gently"Directed by: Max Abbiss-BiroProduction company: Sensons Films
 "In My Arms"Directed by: Dick CarruthersProduction company: Bug
 "Don't Say Your Love is Killing Me"Directed by: Richard HeslopProduction company: Oil Factory
 "Rain"
 "Freedom"Directed by: Vince ClarkeProduction company: State
 "Solsbury Hill"Directed by: Vince ClarkeProduction company: Battlecruiser
 "Make Me Smile (Come Up and See Me)"Directed by: Jonas OdellProduction company: Nexus

Disc two
 "Sometimes" (Top of the Pops debut performance, 20 November 1986)
 "Sono Luminus" (Acoustic Version)
 "In My Arms" (U.S. Version)Directed by: Geoff Moore
 "Too Darn Hot" (from Red Hot and Blue)Directed by: Adelle Luts and Sandy McLeod
 "Leave Me to Bleed" (Live - The Circus Tour, 17 April 1987)
 "A Little Respect" (Live - The Innocents Tour, 15 November 1988)
 "Supernature" (Live - Wild! Tour, 11 December 1989)
 "Waiting For the Day" (Live - Phantasmagorical Entertainment Tour, 6 August 1992)
 "Fingers & Thumbs (Cold Summer's Day)" (Live - The Tiny Tour, 11 November 1996)
 Promotional Documentary: Chorus, 1991
 Promotional Documentary: Pop! - the First 20 Hits, 1992
 Promotional Documentary: I Say I Say I Say, 1994
 Promotional Documentary: Erasure, 1995
 Promotional Documentary: Cowboy, 1997
 Promotional Documentary: Hits!, 2003

References

External links
 Hits! the Videos at Discogs

Erasure compilation albums
2003 video albums
2003 compilation albums